Bobby Vinton Sings Satin Pillows and Careless is Bobby Vinton's thirteenth studio album, released in January 1966.

Two singles came from this album: the album title tracks on one single and "Petticoat White (Summer Sky Blue)".

Cover versions include "Everyone's Gone to the Moon" and "Someday (You'll Want Me to Want You)".

Track listing

Charts
Album - Billboard (North America)

Singles - Billboard (North America)

References

1966 albums
Bobby Vinton albums
Albums produced by Billy Sherrill
Epic Records albums